Vidalia High School may refer to:

Vidalia Comprehensive High School in Vidalia, Georgia
Vidalia High School (Louisiana) in Vidalia, Louisiana